RIP kinases (receptor-interacting protein kinases) are a class of serine/threonine protein kinases. In humans, five different RIP kinases are known:

 RIPK1
 RIPK2
 RIPK3
 RIPK4
 RIPK5

Further reading 
 

\

EC 2.7.11
Human proteins
Protein kinases